Charles Joseph "Buddy" Bolden (September 6, 1877 – November 4, 1931) was an African American cornetist who was regarded by contemporaries as a key figure in the development of a New Orleans style of ragtime music, or "jass", which later came to be known as jazz.

Childhood

When he was born, Bolden's father, Westmore Bolden, was working as a driver for William Walker, the former master of Buddy's grandfather Gustavus Bolden, who died in 1866. His mother, Alice (née Harris), was 18 when she married Westmore on August 14, 1873. Westmore Bolden was around 25 at the time, as records show that he was 19 in August 1866. When Buddy was six his father died, after which the boy lived with his mother and other family members. In records of the period the family name is variously spelled Bolen, Bolding, Boldan, and Bolden, thus complicating research. Buddy likely attended Fisk School in New Orleans, though evidence is circumstantial, as early records of this and other local schools are missing.

Musical career

Bolden was known as "King" Bolden (see Jazz royalty), and his band was at its peak in New Orleans from around 1900 to 1907. He was known for his loud sound and improvisational skills, and his style had an impact on younger musicians. Bolden's trombonist Willie Cornish, among others, recalled making phonograph cylinder recordings with the Bolden band, but none are known to survive.

Many early jazz musicians credited Bolden and his bandmates with having originated what came to be known as jazz, though the term was not in common musical use until after Bolden was musically active. At least one writer has labeled Bolden the father of jazz. He is credited with creating a looser, more improvised version of ragtime and adding blues; Bolden's band was said to be the first to have brass instruments play the blues. He was also said to have adapted ideas from gospel music heard in uptown African-American Baptist churches.

Instead of imitating other cornetists, Bolden played the music he heard "by ear" and adapted it to his horn. In doing so, he created an exciting and novel fusion of ragtime, black sacred music, marching-band music, and rural blues. He rearranged the typical New Orleans dance band of the time to better accommodate the blues: string instruments became the rhythm section, and the front-line instruments were clarinets, trombones, and Bolden's cornet. Bolden was known for his powerful, loud, "wide open" playing style. Joe "King" Oliver, Freddie Keppard, Bunk Johnson, and other early New Orleans jazz musicians were directly inspired by his playing.

One of the best known Bolden numbers is "Funky Butt" (later known as "Buddy Bolden's Blues"), which represents one of the earliest references to the concept of funk in popular music. Bolden's "Funky Butt" was, as Danny Barker once put it, a reference to the olfactory effect of an auditorium packed full of sweaty people "dancing close together and belly rubbing."

Bolden is also credited with the invention of the "Big Four," a key rhythmic innovation on the marching band beat, which gave embryonic jazz much more room for individual improvisation. As Wynton Marsalis explains, the big four (below) was the first syncopated bass drum pattern to deviate from the standard on-the-beat march. The second half of the Big Four is the pattern commonly known as the hambone rhythm developed from sub-Saharan African music traditions.

Physical and mental decline

Bolden had an episode of acute alcoholic psychosis in 1907 at age 30. With the full diagnosis of dementia praecox (today called schizophrenia), he was admitted to the Louisiana State Insane Asylum at Jackson, a mental institution, where he spent the rest of his life. Recent research has suggested that Bolden may in fact have had pellagra, a vitamin deficiency common among poor and black groups in the population, and in 1907 sweeping through the South. His death on November 4, 1931, was caused by Cerebral arteriosclerosis according to the death certificate.

Further life and legend

While there is substantial first-hand oral history about Bolden, facts about his life continue to be lost amidst colorful myth. Stories about his being a barber by trade or that he published a scandal sheet called The Cricket have been repeated in print despite being debunked decades earlier.

Tributes to Bolden

Music

Duke Ellington paid tribute to Bolden in his 1957 suite A Drum Is a Woman. The trumpet part was taken by Clark Terry.
The Bolden band tune "Funky Butt", better known as "Buddy Bolden's Blues" since it was first recorded under that title by Jelly Roll Morton, alternatively titled "I Thought I Heard Buddy Bolden Say," has been covered by hundreds of artists, including Dr. John, on his album Goin' Back to New Orleans, and Hugh Laurie, on his album Let Them Talk.
"Hey, Buddy Bolden" is a song on the album Nina Simone Sings Ellington.
Wynton Marsalis speaks about Bolden in an introduction and performs "Buddy Bolden" on his album Live at the Village Vanguard.
The Buddyprisen, or Buddy Award, is the prime award honoring Norwegian jazz musicians.
Hop Along wrote "Buddy in the Parade" as a tribute to Bolden.
Malachi Thompson recorded Buddy Bolden's Rag in 1995.

Fiction
Bolden has inspired a number of fictional characters with his name.

The Canadian author Michael Ondaatje wrote the novel Coming Through Slaughter, which features a Buddy Bolden character who in some ways resembles Bolden, but in other ways is deliberately contrary to what is known about him.
The character of Buddy Bolden helps Samuel Clemens solve a murder in Peter J. Heck's novel, A Connecticut Yankee in Criminal Court (1996).
He is a notable character in Louis Maistros' novel The Sound of Building Coffins, which contains many scenes depicting Bolden playing his cornet.
Canadian author Christine Welldon wrote the novel Kid Sterling, (2021) which centers around the character of Buddy Bolden and his life, based on the author's archival research.

Plays and films
Bolden is featured in August Wilson's play Seven Guitars. Wilson's drama includes the character King Hedley, whose father named him after King Buddy Bolden. King Hedley constantly sings, "I thought I heard Buddy Bolden say..." and believes that Bolden will come down and bring him money to buy a plantation.
A biopic about Bolden with mythical elements, titled Bolden!, was released in 2019. It was written and directed by Dan Pritzker. Gary Carr portrays Bolden. 
During the 1980s, an adaptation of Michael Ondaatje's novel Coming Through Slaughter was staged at Harvard's Hasty Pudding Theater. The music was scored by Steven Provizer and the production was directed by Tim McDonough.
In 2011, Interact Theater in Minneapolis created a new musical theater piece entitled Hot Jazz at da Funky Butt in which Bolden was the feature character. The music and lyrics were by Aaron Gabriel and featured the New Orleans Band "Rue Fiya." The song "Dat's How Da Music Do Ya" featured the Buddy Bolden Blues.
A three channel video installation, "Precarity", was created by the British experimental filmmaker John Akomfrah in 2017 as a commissioned piece for the Ogden Museum and the Nasher Museum, exploring themes related to the life of Buddy Bolden. In 2019, a full-length feature film was made in memory of him simply titled "Bolden".

Personal life
Bolden married Hattie Oliver and had a child with her, born on the second of May, 1897. They named their son Charles Joseph Bolden, Jr.

His great-grandson Sammie "Big Sam"  Williams is also a local New Orleans musician.

References

Sources

Further reading
Barker, Danny, 1998, Buddy Bolden and the Last Days of Storyville. New York: Continuum. p. 31.

External links

 
 The Real Buddy Bolden The Syncopated Times
 Buddy Bolden's New Orleans Music
 "Charles "Buddy" Bolden (1877–1931) Red Hot Jazz Archive
 Buddy Bolden Biography, PBS, Jazz, A Film by Ken Burns
 

1877 births
1931 deaths
African-American jazz musicians
American jazz cornetists
Jazz musicians from New Orleans
American jazz bandleaders
People with schizophrenia
American ragtime musicians
People from Jackson, Louisiana
The Eagle Band members
20th-century African-American musicians